Makomanai Station (真駒内駅) is a rapid transit station in Minami-ku, Sapporo, Hokkaido, Japan. The station number is N16. It is the south terminus of the Namboku Line.

The Makomanai Park is about 10 minutes by bus, or 20 minutes walking distance from the station.

Platforms

Surrounding area
Japan National Route 453 (to Date)
Minami Ward Office
Sapporo Salmon Museum
Makomanai Park
Makomanai Ice Arena
Makomanai Open Stadium
Police station Complex, South Makomanai
Mieux Cristal shopping center
Hokkaido Bank, Makomanai

Railway stations in Japan opened in 1971
Railway stations in Sapporo
Sapporo Municipal Subway
Minami-ku, Sapporo